Moira Zeta Enetama is a Niuean curator and cultural activist, who, as of 2021, was acting director of the Ministry of Social Services in Niue. She is also the Director of Tāoga Niue Museum. She is a former director of Taoga Niue, the governmental department that oversees cultural activities and preservation. During her directorship of Taoga Niue, Cyclone Heta destroyed Huanaki Cultural Centre & Museum, a disaster that Enetama described as "devasting". She has been outspoken on the benefit television can bring to ensure survival of the Niuean language.

References

External links 

 Interview: Māori strategies used as example to help in Niuean language revitalisation
YouTube: APT3 / Tahiono Arts Collective : Moira Enetama & Al Tama Posimani: Tulana mahu (Shrine to abundance)

Living people
Year of birth missing (living people)
Museum directors
Niuean women in politics
Women curators
Women museum directors
Niuean politicians